BEST OF VOCAL WORKS [nZk] is the first greatest hits album by Hiroyuki Sawano, released on February 4, 2015, on DefSTAR Records. It contains some of his vocal works from Guilty Crown, Attack on Titan, Blue Exorcist, KILL la KILL, Sengoku Basara and Aldnoah.Zero.

Track listing 

Personnel

 Hiroyuki Sawano
 Programming 
 Keyboards (#1-5.7-13.15.16.17)
 Piano (#6.13.14.18.19)
 Background Vocals (#1.5.18.19) 
 cAnON. - Background Vocals  (#18)
 Mika Kobayashi
 Vocals (#1.6.8.14.17)
 Additional Voice (#7)
 mpi
 Vocals (#2.7.12.15)
 Additional Voice (#1)
 Background Vocals  (#1.5)
 David Whitaker：Rap (#3.10.17)
 Aimee Blackschleger：Vocals (#4.11.16)
 Cyua：Vocals (#5.13)
 CASG (Caramel Apple Sound Gadget)：Vocals (#9)
 Benjamin Anderson：Vocals (#15)
 Aimer：Vocals (#18)
 mizuki：Vocals (#19)
 Yu“masshoi”Yamauchi
 Drums (#1.2.3.4.8.10.11.12.13.16.17.18.19)
 Percussion (#14)
 Toshino Tanabe：Bass  (#1.2.3.10.11.12.16.17.18.19)
 Hiroshi Iimuro：Guitars (#1.2.3.4.6.7.8.10.11.12.15.16.17.18)
 yassh!!：Background Vocals (#1.5.18)
 Kouichiro Muroya Group：Strings (#3.6.7.18)
 Otohiko Fujita、Yoshiyuki Uema、Tsutomu Isohata：Horn (#3.7)
 Atsushi Doyama、Jo Kishigami、Chie Matsushima：Horn (#3)
 Takeshi Taneda：Bass (#4.8)
 Tetsuro Touyama：Guitars  (#5.13.14.19)
 Yasushi Katsumata：Horn (#7)
 Yuko Kawai、Hikaru、Sen、Melo-J：Background Vocals (#8.17.18)
 Yu Uchida：Background Vocals (#8.17)
 Yumiko Inoue、Hajime、KEI：Background Vocals (#8)
 Kaori Nishina：Background Vocals (#17)
 Akiko Shimodoi、Ai Inoue：Background Vocals (#18)

References

2015 compilation albums
Hiroyuki Sawano albums